The 2011 UK & Ireland Greyhound Racing Year was the 86th year of greyhound racing in the United Kingdom and Ireland.

Summary
Taylors Sky claimed the headlines during the year with his 2011 English Greyhound Derby triumph but Blonde Snapper also impressed by virtue of winning the William Hill Classic and Eden Star arrived on the scene with his Puppy Derby, the Romford Puppy Cup and Laurels victories. The Scottish Greyhound Derby went to Charlie Lister for the sixth time, with the greyhound Taylors Cruise, and he also won his third trainers championship.

Charlie Lister was rewarded for his services to greyhound racing when being honoured with an O.B.E in the New Year Honours. He became the first ever trainer to be recognised and ended 2011 with six English Derbies, six Scottish Derbies, 46 major competitions, four trainer of the year awards and five trainers championship wins.

Tracks
Hopes were still high that Walthamstow Stadium could be saved, Henlow Stadium owner Bob Morton pledged to keep it alive and provide 500 jobs. However the longer it remained unused as a greyhound track the less likely it would return. Towards the end of the year plans were released by developer London and Quadrant to build 294 homes on the site which created an added supporter in favour of saving the stadium in the form of the newly formed residents association. The iconic entrance sign to the stadium would continue to be seen regardless of the outcome because it was giving a listed building status.

Newbridge in County Kildare suffered a closure in March but was soon purchased by Morgan & Franklin Consortium headed by Managing Director, David Morgan. Morgan had worked at a senior level with Bord na gCon in the past and was also the stadium director for Semple Stadium a hurling venue. The consortium included Peter Franklin, former head of marketing at the Bord Na gCon.

Independent stadium Ayr (Whitletts at Voluntary Park) closed after the local council had health and safety concerns.

Competitions
BAGS (Bookmakers’ Afternoon Greyhound Service) and S.I.S introduced a track championship in which Monmore won the final on home turf.

The Northern Irish Derby was introduced and carried a £25,000 prize, the richest ever held in Northern Ireland. The event was to be held at Drumbo Park. There was a dead heat in the Cesarewitch between Farloe Kraven and Westmead Palace.

News
A series of owner’s bonus series races were introduced by the Greyhound Board of Great Britain, the governing body. Hall Green trainer Mark Barlow relinquished his licence after being suspended for six months by the GBGB; the prominent trainer took the decision because he felt the suspension over one of his greyhounds vomiting on course was unjust. Long serving Romford trainer Peter Payne retired after ill health. 2010 greyhound of the year Jimmy Lollie won the Festival Flyer at Sunderland and Coral Sprint at Hove before finally being retired in October after 125 races. Chris Allsopp of Monmore was trainer of the year.

Roll of honour

Principal UK finals

+ disqualified in semi finals

	

+ Track record

Principal Irish finals

References 

Greyhound racing in the United Kingdom
Greyhound racing in the Republic of Ireland
2011 in British sport
2011 in Irish sport